The 2011 Tashkent Challenger was a professional tennis tournament played on hard courts. It was the fourth edition of the tournament which was part of the 2011 ATP Challenger Tour. It took place in Tashkent, Uzbekistan between 19 and 25 September 2011.

ATP entrants

Seeds

 1 Rankings are as of September 12, 2011.

Other entrants
The following players received wildcards into the singles main draw:
  Murad Inoyatov
  Temur Ismailov
  Nigmat Shofayziev
  Vishnu Vardhan

The following players received entry from the qualifying draw:
  Andrey Boldarev
  Sarvar Ikramov
  Evgeny Kirillov
  Stanislav Poplavskyy

The following players received entry as a lucky loser into the singles main draw:
  Jakhongir Khaydarov
  Sergey Shipilov
  Pavel Tsoy

Champions

Singles

 Denis Istomin def.  Jürgen Zopp, 6–4, 6–3

Doubles

 Harri Heliövaara /  Denys Molchanov def.  John Paul Fruttero /  Raven Klaasen, 7–6(7–5), 7–6(7–3)

External links
Official Website
ITF Search
ATP official site

Tashkent Challenger
Tashkent Challenger